Lucy Lee-Robbins (1865–1943) was an expatriate American painter living in France. She is known for her portraits of female nudes, an unusual subject for women painters in the late 19th century. She was the first female associate member of the Société Nationale des Beaux-Arts.

Biography
Lee-Robbins was born on 24 June 1865 in New York. She and her family moved to Paris in the 1880s. In 1884 she joined a women's atelier run by Carolus-Duran and Jean-Jacques Henner. The same year her portrait was painted by Carolus-Duran.

In 1887 Lee-Robbins debuted at the Salon of the Société des Artistes Français.

Starting in 1889 she exhibited with the Societe Nationale des Beaux-Arts and in 1890 was appointed the first female associate member of the Societe.

Lee-Robbins exhibited her work at the Palace of Fine Arts at the 1893 World's Columbian Exposition in Chicago, Illinois.

In 1895 she married fellow painter Hendrik-George van Rinkhuyzen.

Lee-Robbins died on 28 July 1943 in Paris, France. Because her final years were spent in Nazi-occupied Paris, the disposition of her paintings is not well documented.

Gallery

References

External links

images of Lucy Lee-Robbins' art on ArtNet

1865 births
1943 deaths
American women painters
19th-century American women artists
20th-century American women artists
19th-century American painters
20th-century American painters